The Green Theatre is an open-air theatre in Baku, the capital city of Azerbaijan. The theatre seats 2500 spectators.

The theatre was built in the mid-1960s on the initiative of the city's mayor of the time Alish Lambaranski. The Green Theatre was built as a venue intended for important cultural events.

In 1993, the theatre ceased functioning. In August 2005, Ilham Aliyev, the President of Azerbaijan ordered to carry out repairs works in the theatre. Speaking at the opening ceremony, Ilham Aliyev hoped that the venue would become "the favourite entertainment place of the people of Baku".

References

Theatres in Baku
Culture in Baku
Tourist attractions in Baku
Buildings and structures in Baku